Al-Mardini denotes an origin from Mardin, Upper Mesopotamia. Al-Mardini may refer to:

 Masawaih al-Mardini, 11th-century physician
 Sibt al-Mardini, 15th-century Egyptian-born astronomer and mathematician

See also
Mardini, a related surname

Arabic-language surnames
Mardini